Julia Lovell  (born 1975) is a British scholar and prize-winning author and translator focusing on China.

Life and career 
Lovell is professor of Modern Chinese History and Literature at Birkbeck, University of London, where her research has been focused principally on the relationship between culture (specifically, literature, architecture, historiography and sport) and modern Chinese nation-building.

Lovell's books include The Politics of Cultural Capital: China's Quest for a Nobel Prize in Literature (University of Hawaii Press, 2006); The Great Wall: China Against the World 1000 BC – AD 2000 (Atlantic Books, 2006); and The Opium War: Drugs, Dreams and the Making of China (Picador, 2011).

Lovell is also a literary translator; her translations include works by Lu Xun, Han Shaogong, Eileen Chang and Zhu Wen. Zhu Wen's book I Love Dollars and Other Stories of China, which Lovell translated, was a finalist for the Kiriyama Prize in 2008. Her book The Opium War: Drugs, Dreams and the Making of China won the Jan Michalski Prize for Literature. It was the first non-fiction book to win the prize.

She was awarded a Philip Leverhulme Prize in 2010 in the category of Medieval, Early Modern, and Modern History. These prizes are given to young scholars who have made a significant contribution to their field.

Lovell has written articles about China for The Guardian, The Times, The Economist and The Times Literary Supplement.

She is married to author Robert Macfarlane.

Reception 
Lovell's book The Opium Wars: Drugs, Dreams and the Making of China was widely reviewed in both scholarly journals and the press. Matthew W. Mosca, writing in the Journal of Asian Studies, wrote that the Opium War had "once ranked among the most studied events in Chinese history", but interest had notably declined. Lovell, he said, suggested that there were still holes in English language coverage and that Chinese scholarly and popular interest in the war has, if anything, grown. Lovell, he concludes, "is certainly correct that the Opium War, as an event in the round, has been curiously neglected in Western scholarship" and hers is "the only book-length general history of the conflict in English by an author directly consulting both Chinese and Western sources." He noted that the book devoted much space to explaining how 20th-century politics, especially under the Nationalist Party government of Chiang Kai-shek, used these events to build patriotic sentiment.

Oxford University professor Rana Mitter wrote in The Guardian that Lovell's book "is part of a trend in understanding the British empire and China's role in it," and that the "sense of an unfolding tragedy, explicable but inexorable, runs through the book, making it a gripping read as well as an important one." A reviewer in The Economist commented: "Julia Lovell's excellent new book explores why this period of history is so emotionally important for the Chinese" and "more importantly” explains “how China turned the Opium Wars into a founding myth of its struggle for modernity."

Jeffrey Wasserstrom wrote in Time that Lovell's translation of the works of Lu Xun "could be considered the most significant Penguin Classic ever published."

Awards and honours 
 2010 Philip Leverhulme Prize
 2012 Jan Michalski Prize for Literature, winner, The Opium War: Drugs, Dreams and the Making of China
 2019 Baillie Gifford Prize, shortlisted
 2019 elected Fellow of the British Academy
 2019 Cundill History Prize, winner, Maoism

Selected works

Translations 
 
 
 
 
 
  Translation of selected chapters of the 16th century novel Xiyou Ji into lively contemporary English, with an extensive Introduction by Lovell and a Preface by Gene Luen Yang.

References

External links 

 Interview with Julia Lovell, Paper Republic.
 "Julia Lovell's Lu Xun," Danwei.
 Julia Lovell, "Beijing Values the Nobels: That's Why This Hurts." 
 Kiriyama Prize Finalists.
 Yang Guang, "Establishing a Bond with Chinese writing," China Daily (July 30, 2010).

1975 births
Living people
British sinologists
Chinese–English translators
Literary translators
Fellows of the British Academy
British translators